Thomas Gee Mason (born 31 December 1942) is a retired Scottish Conservative Party
politician, who was a Member of the Scottish Parliament (MSP) for the North East Scotland region. Mason was sworn in on 20 June 2017, following the resignation of Ross Thomson. He stood down at the 2021 election.

He was educated at King's College London (BSc, 1964) and the Cranfield School of Management (MBA 1972).

Mason is also a councillor on Aberdeen City Council.

Political career
Mason stood unsuccessfully for the Scottish Parliament as the Conservative candidate in the Aberdeen Central constituency in 1999 and 2016.

In the 2017 Aberdeen council election he was elected as a councillor, then became depute Provost.

References

External links 
 

1942 births
Living people
Alumni of King's College London
Conservative MSPs
Members of the Scottish Parliament 2016–2021
Scottish Conservative Party councillors
Councillors in Aberdeen
Alumni of Cranfield University